Tamade Station may refer to:
 Tamade Station (Osaka), a subway station in Nishinari-ku, Osaka, Japan
 Tamade Station (Nara), a railway station in Gose, Nara, Japan